Laura Longauerová (born 30 August 1995) is a Slovak model and beauty pageant titleholder who was crowned Miss Slovensko 2014 and Miss Universe Slovenskej Republiky 2019. She represented Slovakia at the Miss World 2014 competition and also represented Slovakia at the Miss Universe 2019 competition.

Personal life 
Longauerová was born on 1995 and studies Finances and Accounting at the University of Economics in Prague, at Czech Republic. She works as a Sales Management Assistant at Mercedes Benz.

Pageantry

Miss Slovensko 2014 
She competed at Miss Slovensko 2014 on April 11, 2014. She won and was given the right to represent her country at the Miss World 2014 competition.

Miss World 2014 
She represented Slovakia at the Miss World 2014 competition held on December 14, 2014, at the ExCeL London, London, United Kingdom. She failed to place.

Miss Intercontinental Slovakia 2018 
Laura returned to pageantry as she competed at Miss Intercontinental Slovakia 2018 where she won and given the right to represent Slovakia at the Miss Intercontinental 2018 pageant.

Miss Intercontinental 2018 
Laura competed at Miss Intercontinental 2018 held at the Mall of Asia Arena, Pasay in the Philippines on January 26, 2019. She finished as the second runner-up to the eventual winner who was Karen Gallman of the Philippines. During the continental crowning, She was crowned as Miss Intercontinental Europe. She's also second runner-up on a special award named Miss Playa Calatagan.

Miss Universe Slovenskej Republiky 2019 
In collaboration with the 2019 Česká Miss competition. Laura won Miss Universe Slovenskej Republiky 2019. As the winner, She won 100,000 euros and an apartment at Prague, Czech Republic.

Miss Universe 2019 
As Miss Universe Slovenskej Republiky, she represented Slovakia at the Miss Universe 2019 competition but was unplaced.

References

External links
Official Miss Universe Slovenskej Republiky website

1995 births
Living people
Slovak female models
Slovak beauty pageant winners
Miss World 2014 delegates
Miss Universe 2019 contestants
People from Detva
Prague University of Economics and Business alumni